Route 12 is a numbered state highway in Rhode Island, United States.

Route description
Route 12 starts at Route 14 and Route 102 in Foster. It roughly follows the shore of the Scituate Reservoir before passing over its dam. It passes over I-295 without an interchange and heads towards downtown Cranston. After passing the city center as a main east–west corridor, Route 2 passes Route 10's southern terminus. It passes US 1A and ends at Broad Street, an old alignment of US 1A,  later.

History

Major intersections

References

External links

2019 Highway Map, Rhode Island

012
Transportation in Providence County, Rhode Island